Italo Vassallo (1940 – 30 July 2021) was an Italian-Eritrean footballer. He played for Ethiopia internationally, scoring in their 1962 Africa Cup of Nations final victory over Egypt. His half-brother is Luciano Vassallo, a former footballer for the Ethiopian team.

Club career

Vassallo made his debut at Hamasien where he won the Ethiopian First Division for the first time in 1957.

When Vassallo's half-brother Luciano moved to Cotton Factory Club, Italo joined him at 17 years old. They would go on to win the Ethiopian First Division four times at Cotton FC before retiring in 1973.

International career

Once Eritrean-born footballers were allowed to be called up for the national team, Italo and Luciano were selected for the 1962 Africa Cup of Nations. Italo scored a goal in Ethiopia's extra-time victory in the final against Egypt.

After football

During the Eritrean–Ethiopian War, Italo was expelled from Ethiopia and returned to Eritrea. He ran a restaurant in Asmara.

Career statistics

International goals

Scores and results list Ethiopia's goal tally first, score column indicates score after each Vassallo goal.

See also

Luciano Vassallo
GS Asmara
Italians of Ethiopia
Italian Eritreans
Giovanni De Min (footballer)

References

External links
FIFA profile

1940 births
2021 deaths
Eritrean footballers
Ethiopian footballers
Ethiopia international footballers
1962 African Cup of Nations players
Ethiopian people of Italian descent
Eritrean people of Italian descent
Eritrean emigrants to Italy
Ethiopian emigrants to Italy
Africa Cup of Nations-winning players
Association football forwards
Sportspeople from Asmara
Italian sportspeople of African descent